Camille Médy (24 December 1902 – 28 May 1989) was a French cross-country skier. He competed at the 1924 Winter Olympics and the 1928 Winter Olympics.

References

External links
 

1902 births
1989 deaths
French male cross-country skiers
Olympic cross-country skiers of France
Cross-country skiers at the 1924 Winter Olympics
Cross-country skiers at the 1928 Winter Olympics
Sportspeople from Vosges (department)
20th-century French people